Sir Martin Kelso Wallace (3 May 1898 – 12 February 1978) was a Unionist politician in Northern Ireland.

Wallace attended Methodist College Belfast and served in the RNVR during the First World War. He worked as a company director and was elected as an Ulster Unionist Party member of the Belfast Corporation. He was elected as Lord Mayor of Belfast in 1961 and served for two years. He became a Knight Bachelor in 1963. His mayoralty made him an ex-officio member of the Senate of Northern Ireland.

References

1898 births
1978 deaths
High Sheriffs of Belfast
Members of the Senate of Northern Ireland 1957–1961
Members of the Senate of Northern Ireland 1961–1965
Lord Mayors of Belfast
People educated at Methodist College Belfast
Knights Bachelor
Ulster Unionist Party members of the Senate of Northern Ireland